Michael Healy Lacayo (born c. 1962) is a Nicaraguan businessman. In September 2020, he was elected to a three-year term as president of the Superior Council for Private Enterprise (COSEP), the country’s leading business chamber. Previously he was president of the Union of Agricultural Producers of Nicaragua (UPANIC), as a sugar cane and banana producer. He was also vice-president of COSEP.

Healy is a member of the Civic Alliance for Justice and Democracy, an opposition group that emerged after the outbreak of the 2018–2021 Nicaraguan protests.

In October 2021, Healy was arrested on allegations of money laundering and terrorism under Law 1055, three weeks before the 2021 Nicaraguan general election. His predecessor as COSEP president and pre-candidate for president of Nicaragua, José Adán Aguerri, has been held since June on similar charges, one of 37 opposition figures Daniel Ortega’s administration has arrested.

Personal life
Healy is married to Rossana Argüello, with whom he has three children.

References

Nicaraguan businesspeople
Agriculturalists
1960s births
Living people